Tylosurus is a genus of needlefish, one of ten in the family Belonidae. They are found worldwide in tropical and warmer temperate seas and two species have been recorded as Lessepsian migrants in the eastern Mediterranean Sea.

Species
The seven currently recognized species in this genus are:
 Tylosurus acus (Lacepède, 1803)
 T. a. acus (Lacépède, 1803) (Agujon needlefish)
 T. a. imperialis (Rafinesque, 1810)
 T. a. melanotus (Bleeker, 1850) (keel-jawed needlefish)
 T. a. rafale Collette & Parin, 1970 (Atlantic agujon needlefish)
 Tylosurus choram (Rüppell, 1837) (Red Sea houndfish)
 Tylosurus crocodilus (Péron & Lesueur, 1821) (Houndfish)
 Tylosurus fodiator D. S. Jordan & C. H. Gilbert, 1882 (Mexican needlefish)
 Tylosurus gavialoides (Castelnau, 1873) (Stout long tom)
 Tylosurus pacificus (Steindachner, 1876) (Pacific agujon needlefish)
 Tylosurus punctulatus (Günther, 1872) (Spotted long tom)

Etymology
The generic name Tylosurus is a compound created from the Greek words tylos meaning a "callus" and oura meaning "tail", this refers to the keel like structures on the caudal peduncle of these fish.

References

 
Belonidae
Marine fish genera
Taxa named by Anastasio Cocco